Walter L. Craig  (1953 – January 18, 2019) was a Canadian mathematician and a Canada Research Chair in Mathematical Analysis and Applications at McMaster University.

Personal life 
Craig was born in State College, Pennsylvania in 1953.  His father, a professor at Pennsylvania State University transferred to University of California, Berkeley, which is where Craig and his siblings were raised starting in 1959. 

Craig was the son of the logician William Craig and the husband of mathematician Deirdre Haskell.

Education 
Craig attended the University of California at Berkeley and, after spending two years performing as a jazz musician, returned there to graduate with a bachelor's degree in mathematics in 1977. Craig earned his Ph.D. from New York University - Courant Institute in 1981; his dissertation, A Bifurcation Theory for Periodic Dissipative Wave Equations, was supervised by Louis Nirenberg.

Career 
After stints at the California Institute of Technology, Stanford University, and Brown University, Craig moved to McMaster University in Hamilton, Ontario, Canada in 2000.  His research topic included nonlinear partial differential equation, infinite dimensional Hamiltonian systems, Schrödinger operators and spectral theory, water waves, general relativity, and cosmology.

In 2007, he was made a Fellow of the Royal Society of Canada and he was awarded a Killiam Fellowship in 2009.

In 2013, he became one of the inaugural Fellows of the American Mathematical Society. He served as Director of the Fields Institute from 2013 to 2015.

References

1953 births
2019 deaths
People from State College, Pennsylvania
Academic staff of McMaster University
Canadian mathematicians
Fellows of the Royal Society of Canada
Fellows of the American Mathematical Society
UC Berkeley College of Letters and Science alumni
New York University alumni